Lady Bardales (born November 29, 1982) is a Peruvian police officer who worked for former president Alejandro Toledo in 2005. Bardales is a lieutenant in the Peruvian National Police and was assigned to provide protection for President Toledo's wife.

Background
Lady Bardales was a fugitive of justice for months as she was sentenced for illegal enrichment, but failed to show up at court. On July 2, 2008, she surrendered to authorities.

On September 23, 2008, Lady Bardales was released from prison, with all charges dropped due to lack of evidence.

Personal life
In 2019, Bardales announced that she had become a born-again Christian and was engaged to be married. She currently lives in Lima

References

1982 births
Fugitives wanted by Peru
Law enforcement in Peru
Living people